A by-election was held for the New South Wales Legislative Assembly electorate of East Sydney on 22 May 1872 because Henry Parkes had been appointed Premier and Colonial Secretary, forming the first Parkes ministry. Such ministerial by-elections were usually uncontested however on this occasion a poll was required in East Sydney and Newcastle (George Lloyd), while the five other ministers, Edward Butler (Argyle), James Farnell (Parramatta), Joseph Innes (Mudgee), William Piddington (The Hawkesbury) and John Sutherland (Paddington), were re-elected unopposed.

James Jones had been an unsuccessful candidate for Central Cumberland at the 1868 by-election, and the 1869 election.

Dates

Result

Henry Parkes was appointed Premier and Colonial Secretary, forming the first Parkes ministry.

See also
Electoral results for the district of East Sydney
List of New South Wales state by-elections

References

1872 elections in Australia
New South Wales state by-elections
1870s in New South Wales